Reilly Paterson (born 22 August 2000) is a US-raised Jamaican footballer who plays as a midfielder for the Evansville Purple Aces and the Jamaica women's national team.

Early life
Paterson was raised in Temecula, California.

International career
Paterson made her senior debut for Jamaica on 30 September 2019.

International goals
Scores and results list Jamaica's goal tally first

References 

2000 births
Living people
Jamaican women's footballers
Women's association football midfielders
Jamaica women's international footballers
Sportspeople from Temecula, California
Soccer players from California
American women's soccer players
Notre Dame de Namur University alumni
University of Evansville alumni
American people of Jamaican descent
Evansville Purple Aces women's soccer players